Philosophy and Science Fiction is an anthology published in 1984.

Plot summary
Philosophy and Science Fiction contains 14 stories, one play (Capek's R U R), two extracts, roughly 30 pages of introductory philosophy, and Study Questions.

Reception
Dave Langford reviewed Philosophy and Science Fiction for White Dwarf #65, and stated that "Too expensive for most; interesting if you contemplate a philosophy course. Can editor and self-confessed philosopher Michael Philips really not spell hermeneutics? He gets it wrong ten times in two pages."

Reviews
Review by Michael R. Collings (1984) in Fantasy Review, November 1984
Review by Don D'Ammassa (1985) in Science Fiction Chronicle, #64 January 1985

References

1984 short story collections